Trikoupis is a surname. Notable people with the surname include:

 Charilaos Trikoupis (1832–1896), Greek politician
 Ioannis Trikoupis (1750–1824), Greek politician
 Nikolaos Trikoupis (1862–1956), Greek general and politician
 Spyridon Trikoupis (1788–1873), Greek statesman